The 2005–06 Liga Bet season saw Beitar Safed (champions of the North A division), Hapoel Ahva Haifa (champions of the North B division), Maccabi Amishav Petah Tikva (champions of the South A division) and Hapoel Maxim Lod (champions of the South B division) win their regional divisions and promoted to Liga Alef.

The runners-up in each division entered a promotion/relegation play-offs with the clubs ranked 12th in Liga Alef. In the north section, Beitar Haifa (from North B division) won the play-offs and was promoted. In the south section, Ironi Ramla (from South B division) won the play-offs and was promoted.

Maccabi Kiryat Malakhi, which finished third in the South B division, was also promoted to Liga Alef, after a vacancy was created in the South division, following the merger of Beitar Kiryat Gat and Maccabi Kiryat Gat.

At the bottom, Beitar Jaffa, A.S. Holon (from South A division) and Maccabi Yehud (from South B division) were all relegated to Liga Gimel, whilst Hapoel Ironi I'billin (from North A division) and Hapoel Kafr Misr/Nein (from South A division) folded during the season. However, Hapoel Deir Hanna (from North B division), Maccabi Daliyat al-Karmel (from North B division) and Hapoel Bnei Lakhish (from South B division), which finished in the relegation zone, were all reprieved from relegation, after several vacancies were created in Liga Bet for the 2006–07 season, mostly due to withdrawals and mergers of clubs.

North A Division

During the season, Hapoel Ironi I'billin (after 13 matches) folded and its results were annulled.

North B Division

During the season, Hapoel Kafr Misr/Nein (after 21 matches) folded and its results were annulled.

South A Division

South B Division

Promotion play-offs

North play-off
Liga Bet North A and North B runners-up, Beitar Haifa and Ironi Sayid Umm al-Fahm faced the 12th placed club in Liga Alef North, Maccabi Tamra. The teams played each other in a round-robin tournament, with all matches held at a neutral venue, Kiryat Eliezer Stadium.

Beitar Haifa won the play-offs and was promoted to Liga Alef.

South play-off
Liga Bet South A and Liga Bet South B runners-up, Hapoel Azor and Ironi Ramla faced the 12th placed club in Liga Alef South, Maccabi Sha'arayim. The teams played each other in a round-robin tournament, with all matches held at a neutral venue, Bat Yam Municipal Stadium.

Ironi Ramla won the play-offs and was promoted to Liga Alef.

References
Liga Bet North, 05-06 One 
Liga Bet North B, 05-06 One 
Liga Bet South A, 05-06 One 
Liga Bet South B, 05-06 One 
Play-off Liga Alef/Liga Bet  One 

Liga Bet seasons
5
Israel